Cercaria is the name of a genus of trematodes in the subclass Digenea. It is used as a placeholder genus when the species  description is based on the cercarial life stage and the adult forms are not known.

Species:

Cercaria armata 
Cercaria brevicaeca 
Cercaria brookoveri 
Cercaria burti 
Cercaria caryi 
Cercaria chrysenterica 
Cercaria cloacicola 
Cercaria columbiensis 
Cercaria dermolestes 
Cercaria diastropha 
Cercaria dipterocerca 
Cercaria douglasi 
Cercaria douthitti 
Cercaria elegans 
Cercaria elongata 
Cercaria elvae 
Cercaria emarginatae 
Cercaria gedoelsti 
Cercaria gyrauli 
Cercaria hamata 
Cercaria hemilophura 
Cercaria hezuiensis 
Cercaria himasthloides 
Cercaria hongkongensis 
Cercaria inhabilis 
Cercaria isocotylea 
Cercaria laevicardi
Cercaria leptacantha 
Cercaria linearis 
Cercaria littorinae 
Cercaria longicauda 
Cercaria magnicaudata 
Cercaria megalura 
Cercaria mesostephanus 
Cercaria milfordensis 
Cercaria minus 
Cercaria mortoni 
Cercaria multicellulata 
Cercaria myae 
Cercaria oregonensis 
Cercaria owreae 
Cercaria parvicaudata 
Cercaria pernaviridis 
Cercaria pleurolophocerca 
Cercaria polyadena 
Cercaria reflexae 
Cercaria rubra 
Cercaria shanghaiensis 
Cercaria spelotremoides 
Cercaria stagnicolae 
Cercaria sturniae 
Cercaria tenax 
Cercaria tenuis 
Cercaria trigonura 
Cercaria ubiquitoides 
Cercaria viridis 
Cercaria wardi

References

Plagiorchiida